Nikola Vasilić (born January 30, 1989) is a Serbian footballer who most recently played for San Antonio Scorpions in the North American Soccer League.

Career
Vasilić began his career in 2010 with Mladi Radnik and later competed for KS Elbasani, Sinđelić Niš and Novi Sad, all in Eastern Europe. He moved to the US when he signed for NASL club San Antonio Scorpions on February 19, 2013.

References

External links
 

1989 births
Living people
Serbian footballers
Serbian expatriate footballers
FK Mladi Radnik players
KF Elbasani players
FK Sinđelić Niš players
San Antonio Scorpions players
Expatriate soccer players in the United States
Expatriate footballers in Vanuatu
North American Soccer League players
Association football forwards